South Sound Center is a shopping mall located in Lacey, Washington. Its major stores include Target and Kohl's. The mall is not enclosed, but before major re-development in 2001, the centerpiece of the shopping center was a  enclosed mall.

History
South Sound Center opened in 1966 and was billed as the fourth regional shopping center in the state of Washington. Anchors at one time included Nordstrom Place Two (closed in 1994), Peoples (1966–1983, opening as Mervyns in 1984), Sears (closed in 2019), Pay N' Save (closed in 1992?) and Woolworth (closed in 1997 as the last store of the chain in Washington State). From the 1960s until the mid-1970s, a Safeway grocery store was in a outlot of the mall, though the building has since been demolished. A Joann's Fabrics was also built behind the mall, though it is now an office building.

Around the mall's main building, which is occupied by Target and Kohl's, are a Michaels, Marshalls, PetSmart, Tuesday Morning, and Rite Aid. 

After many stores in the mall moved out or closed, the enclosed mall portion was torn down in 2001 and replaced by a Target store between Sears and Mervyns. In December 2006, Mervyn's closed and was reopened as Kohl's in early 2007.

For some time in 1980s to early 1990s, the center hosted the "Christmas Island" display during the holiday season at the back of the parking lot.  It also hosted an annual fireworks display on July 3 for 45 years before it moved in 2012.

In 2017, Verizon Wireless's store in the mall was crushed by snow and was closed until further notice, later relocating across the street in 2019.

On November 7, 2019, it was announced that Sears would be closing this location as one of 96 stores to close nationwide. The store closed in February 2020. This Sears opened in 1943 and moved to the mall in 1966 for the grand opening of the mall. As of August 2022, other than seasonal Halloween stores, it has not been occupied, and the sign remains up.

References

Buildings and structures in Thurston County, Washington
Lacey, Washington
Power centers (retail) in the United States
Shopping malls established in 1966
Shopping malls in Washington (state)